Venus and Mars (lit. "Fight") is a 2007 South Korean romantic comedy film.  It was directed by Han Ji-seung and stars Sol Kyung-gu and Kim Tae-hee.

Plot 
Despite having little in common, Sang-min and Jin-ah fall in love and get married. Before long they come to realise that they actually can't stand each other, but the resulting split is far from amicable. Things come to a head when Jin-ah refuses to return the pendulum from Sang-min's beloved clock, and their petty squabbles degenerate into life-threatening violence.

Cast 
 Sol Kyung-gu as Kim Sang-min
 Kim Tae-hee as Yoon Jin-ah
 Seo Tae-hwa as Tae-hwa
 Jeon Soo-kyung as Hyang-mi
 Kang Hye-ryeon as Jin-sook
 Kim Tae-wan as In-cheol
 Im Ha-ryong as Divorce lawyer (cameo)

Release 
Venus and Mars was released in South Korea on 12 December 2007, and on its opening weekend was ranked fourth at the box office with 164,750 admissions. The film went on to receive a total of 382,422 admissions nationwide, and as of 27 January 2008 had grossed a total of $2,316,750.

References

External links 
 
 
 

2007 films
2007 romantic comedy films
South Korean romantic comedy films
Cinema Service films
CJ Entertainment films
2000s Korean-language films
2000s South Korean films